The Constitutional and Supervisory Committee is a standing committee of the Icelandic parliament.

Jurisdiction
According to law № 55/1991, with later amendments, all matters relating to the following subjects are referred to the Constitutional and Supervisory Committee:

Constitution
President
Parliament
Agencies
Election
Cabinet

Members, 140th parliament
The main members have seats in the committees and attend the meetings. When they are unable to do so the substitute members temporarily take their place.

Main

Substitute

See also
List of standing committees of the Icelandic parliament

External links
 
 

Standing committees of the Icelandic parliament